The 1915 Maryland Aggies football team represented Maryland Agricultural College (which became Maryland State College in 1916 and part of the University of Maryland in 1920) in the 1915 college football season. In their fifth season under head coach Curley Byrd, the Aggies compiled a 6–3 record, and outscored all opponents, 161 to 69. The team's three losses were to Haverford College (0–7), Catholic University (0–16), and Johns Hopkins (0–3).

Schedule

References

Maryland
Maryland Terrapins football seasons
Maryland Aggies football